The Conservative Party Board is the national governing body of the Conservative Party of the United Kingdom. It is responsible for operational matters such as fundraising, membership, candidates, and internal elections. It is made up of members from each section of the party: voluntary, political and professional. The board meets once a month and works closely with Conservative Campaign Headquarters  elected representatives and the voluntary membership mainly through a number of management sub-committees.

Members

References

External links
Official Website

Executive committees of political parties
Organisation of the Conservative Party (UK)